Zhao Yun (born 15 September 1981 in Nanjing, Jiangsu, China). She is the former China women's national volleyball team setter. She now plays for Guangdong Evergrande and has been appointed the team captain for the 2011-2012 season.

Clubs
  Jiangsu (2004–2009)
  Guangdong Evergrande (2010-2013)

Awards

Clubs
 2006-2007 Chinese League -  Bronze Medal, with Jiangsu
 2008-2009 Chinese League -  Bronze Medal, with Jiangsu
 2010-2011 Chinese League -  Runner-Up, with Guangdong Evergrande
 2011-2012 Chinese League -  Champion, with Guangdong Evergrande

External links
 FIVB Profile

Chinese women's volleyball players
Living people
1981 births
Sportspeople from Nanjing
Volleyball players from Jiangsu
Setters (volleyball)
21st-century Chinese women